Heliophanus verus is a jumping spider species in the genus Heliophanus.  It was first described by Wanda Wesołowska in 1986 and lives in Azerbaijan, Iran and Turkey.

References

Spiders described in 1986
Fauna of Azerbaijan
Fauna of Iran
Arthropods of Turkey
Salticidae
Spiders of Asia
Taxa named by Wanda Wesołowska